Skenea carmelensis, common name the Carmel skenea, is a species of sea snail, a marine gastropod mollusk in the family Skeneidae.

Description
The height of the shell attains 1.3 mm, its diameter 1.7 mm.

Distribution
This species occurs in the Pacific Ocean off California, USA.

References

  Smith & Gordon, The marine mollusks and brachiopods of Monterey Bay,California, and vicinity; Proceedings of the California Academy of Sciences, 4th series, v. 26 (1948)

External links
 To World Register of Marine Species

carmelensis
Gastropods described in 1948